The Agua Caliente Handicap is a defunct thoroughbred horse race that was once the premier event at Agua Caliente Racetrack in Tijuana, Baja California, Mexico, and the richest race in North America. Inaugurated in 1917 as the Coffroth Handicap, it was named in honor of James Wood Coffroth, President of the Lower California Jockey Club. It was run at the Tijuana Racetrack through 1929 after which it was hosted by the newly built Agua Caliente Racetrack.

In the 1930s the event offered a $100,000 purse which drew high-profile stable owners from the United States and Canada such as Adolph B. Spreckels, J. K. L. Ross, Charles Howard, Suzanne Mason and the Seagram family stables. Among the champions to win the race were Round Table, Gallant Sir, who won it twice and in record time, Seabiscuit, and Phar Lap, who won the 1932 race, ridden by Billy Elliot, in track record time. It was the great Australian champion's only North American appearance.

After the 1934 racing season, the government of Mexico outlawed gambling until 1938 by which time the track had been effectively replaced by the new Santa Anita Park in Arcadia, California, United States, the choice of convenience for owners as a place to train, stable, and race their horses. The Agua Caliente Handicap was only run twice more: in 1938, when it was won by Seabiscuit, and in 1958, when it was won by Round Table.

Distances:
1917-1937 : 1¼ miles
1938 : 1 miles
1958 : 1 miles

Records
Speed record: (at 1¼ miles)
 Gallant Sir in 1933, 2:02 3/5

Most wins:
 2 - Gallant Sir (1933, 1934)

Most wins by a jockey:
 no jockey won this race more than once

Most wins by a trainer:
 2 - Harry M. Unna (1921, 1929)
 2 - Elwood L. Fitzgerald (1933, 1934)

Most wins by an owner:
 2 - Northway Stable (1933, 1934)

Winners

References

Hillenbrand, Laura. Seabiscuit: An American Legend. "The Cougar and the Iceman." (2001) Ballantine Books

Open middle distance horse races
Discontinued horse races
Sports in Tijuana
Sports competitions in Baja California